Events from the year 1786 in Russia

Incumbents
 Monarch – Catherine II

Events
 Court Riding Arena in Saint Petersburg begins construction
 Creaking Pagoda completed in Tsarskoye Selo
 Don Host Oblast established
 Fevey - premier of opera by Vasily Pashkevich with libretto by Catherine the Great
 Pashkov House completed in Moscow
 St. Catherine's Cathedral completed in Kherson
 Vodootvodny Canal completed

Births
 Dmitry Begichev, civil servant, writer, senator
 Alexander Chavchavadze, Georgian poet and nobleman, Russian general
 Auguste de Montferrand, French architect who worked principally in Russia
 Roksandra Skarlatovna Edling, courtier  (d. 1844)
 Fyodor Glinka, poet and author
 Gavriil Ignatyev, general
 Maria Nesselrode, courtier  (d. 1803)
 Grand Duchess Maria Pavlovna of Russia (1786–1859), daughter of Paul I of Russia
 Pavel Schilling, diplomat and inventor
 Ekaterina Semenova, actress
 Roxandra Sturdza, philanthropist and writer
 Sergey Uvarov, scholar and civil servant influential in education
 Filipp Vigel, nobleman, civil servant, memoirist
 Otto Magnus von Stackelberg, archaeologist and artist
 Karl Gustav von Strandmann, general

Deaths
 Jovan Horvat, general and founder of New Serbia
 Thomas MacKenzie (Russian admiral), admiral and founder of Sevastopol
 Julia von Mengden, lady-in-waiting and confidant of Grand Dutchess Anna Leopoldovna

References

1786 in the Russian Empire
Years of the 18th century in the Russian Empire